Carl E. Rollyson is an American biographer and professor of journalism at Baruch College, City University of New York.

Selected publications
 Marilyn Monroe: A Life of the Actress (1986, revised 2014)
 Lillian Hellman: Her Life and Legend (1988)
 Nothing Ever Happens to the Brave: The Story of Martha Gellhorn (1990)
 The Lives of Norman Mailer (1991, revised as Norman Mailer: The Last Romantic, 2008)
 Rebecca West: A Life (1996, titled, Rebecca West: A Saga of the Century in the UK, revised as Rebecca West: A Modern Sibyl in 2008)
 The Literary Legacy of Rebecca West (1997)
 Susan Sontag: The Making of an Icon (2000, with Lisa Paddock, revised 2016)
 Herman Melville A to Z: The Essential Reference to His Life and Work (2000, with Lisa Paddock)
 Reading Susan Sontag: A Critical Introduction to Her Work (2001)
 Beautiful Exile: The Life of Martha Gellhorn (2002)
 Reading Susan Sontag (2002)
 Marie Curie: Honesty in Science (2004)
 To Be A Woman: The Life of Jill Craigie (2004)
 Documentary Film: A Primer (2004)
 Reading Biography (2004)
 Essays in Biography (2005)
 A Higher Form of Cannibalism? Adventures in the Art and Politics of Biography (2005)
 Female Icons: Marilyn Monroe to Susan Sontag (2005)
 Rebecca West and the God That Failed: Essays (2005)
 Lives of the Novelists (2005)
 Critical Companion to Herman Melville: A Literary Reference to His Life and Work (2006)
 American Biography (2006)
 Biography: A User’s Guide (2008)
 Emily Dickinson: Self-Discipline in the Service of Art (2009, with Lisa Paddock)
 Thurgood Marshall: Perseverance of Justice (2009, with Lisa Paddock)
 British Biography: A Reader (2009)
 Pablo Picasso: A Biography For Beginners (2009)
 Amy Lowell Among Her Contemporaries (2010)
 Hollywood Enigma: Dana Andrews (2012)
 Amy Lowell Anew: A Biography (2013)
 American Isis: The Life and Art of Sylvia Plath (2013)
 Marilyn Monroe: Day by Day (2014)
 A Real American Character: The Life of Walter Brennan (2015)
 A Private Life of Michael Foot (2015)
 Confessions of a Serial Biographer (2016)
 Understanding Susan Sontag (2016)
 The Last Days of Sylvia Plath (2020)The Life of William Faulkner,  volume 1: The Past is Never Dead  (1897-1934) (2020)
 The Life of William Faulkner, volume 2: This Alarming Paradox'' (1935-1962) (2020)

References

External links 
http://www.carlrollyson.com/works.htm

Living people
Year of birth missing (living people)
American biographers
Baruch College faculty